Gilla Tigernaig Mac Gilla Rónáin, an Augustinian, was a bishop in Ireland during the 13th century: He was Bishop of Clogher  until his death in 1218.

References

13th-century Roman Catholic bishops in Ireland
Pre-Reformation bishops of Clogher
Augustinian bishops
1218 deaths